is a 2004 Japanese superhero film directed by Hiroyuki Nasu. It is based on the manga series of the same name.

Production 
Devilman had a box office gross of 5,200 million yen, despite a production budget of 1 billion yen.

The movie was first scheduled for a May 2004 release, but was postponed due to reshoots. Special effects were produced by Toei Company's tokusatsu and anime divisions, under the joint name T-Visual.

Cast 
  – Akira Fudo
  – Ryo Asuka
 Ayana Sakai – Miki Makimura
 Asuka Shibuya – Miko
 Ryudo Uzaki – Keisuke Makimura (Miki's father)
 Yoko Aki – Emi Makimura (Miki's mother)
 Ai Tominaga – Silene
 Bob Sapp – World Newscaster
 Hiroyuki Matsumoto
 Hirotarō Honda - Asuka
 Mark Musashi – LAPD

Reception
The movie topped an annual poll by the magazine Eiga Hihō for the worst movie, attracting five times as many votes as the second-place film, and also won first place at the Bunshun Kiichigo Awards and Sports Hochi's Hebi-Ichigo Awards. It was voted the worst Japanese film of the 2000s in an online poll, which noted that the excitement of the manga series getting a film adaptation increased the universal disappointment with the film.

At the Sports Hochi awards ceremony Takeshi Kitano called it "one of the 4 most stupid movies ever made after Getting Any?, and " and said "There is nothing better than getting drunk and watching this movie." At the same ceremony Sachiko Kobayashi said she was suddenly called to the set to appear in the movie before she even knew what it was.

The film was universally panned by national newspapers and critics, and even by fans of the original manga, citing reasons such as the CGI being hideous, and the casting of various nationally popular models and teen idols, many of whom had never acted before. In addition, reportedly, CGI was used for the fight scenes because director Hiroyuki Nasu did not know how to direct one with live actors. Due to trying to force the whole story into a short run time, the plot was criticized for making little to no sense. It was also noted that the design of Silene on the poster was completely different to her appearance in the movie. Yuichi Maeda gave this movie 2 points out of a 100 on his writer, stating that the only thing good about this movie was the poster and the concept design. Hiroshi Yamamoto created a whole separate part on his website to collect bad reviews of the movie. It links to several national newspapers that panned the movie as well as links to about 100 blog entries from various critics denouncing the movie.

The movie has since become a benchmark in Japan for the reception of live action movies, with What to Do with the Dead Kaiju? in particular being dubbed "The Devilman of the Reiwa Era" by online users.

References

External links 

Anti Devilman review collection site

2004 science fiction action films
2000s Japanese superhero films
2000s monster movies
2004 horror films
2004 films
Demons in film
Devilman
Films directed by Hiroyuki Nasu
Films set in Japan
Japanese supernatural horror films
Superhero horror films
Live-action films based on manga
Toei Company films
Japanese dark fantasy films
2000s Japanese films